SS Anna Dickinson was a Liberty ship built in the United States during World War II. She was named after Anna Dickinson, an American orator and lecturer. An advocate for the abolition of slavery and for women's rights, Dickinson was the first woman to give a political address before the United States Congress.

Construction
Anna Dickinson was laid down on 26 July 1944, under a Maritime Commission (MARCOM) contract, MC hull 2493, by the St. Johns River Shipbuilding Company, Jacksonville, Florida; she was sponsored by Mrs. James R.P. Bell, Jr., the daughter of Benjamin F. Crowley, vice president St.Johns River SB Co., and was launched on 4 September 1944.

History
She was allocated to the Wessel Duval & Company, on 16 September 1944. On 8 September 1949, she was laid up in the National Defense Reserve Fleet, Mobile, Alabama. She was sold for scrapping, 14 March 1961, to Union Minerals & Alloys Corp., for $58,139.89. She was removed from the fleet, 10 April 1961.

References

Bibliography

 
 
 
 

 

Liberty ships
Ships built in Jacksonville, Florida
1944 ships
Mobile Reserve Fleet